Svrbice is a small village in the Topoľčany District of the Nitra Region in Slovakia, situated approximately 24 km south of Topoľčany. In 2011 it had 209 inhabitants.

One of the most important sightseeings is Roman Catholic Church of Virgin Mary built in 1956. The first written reference to the village dates from 1268. Svrbice was part of Šalgovce from 1976 to 1990.

References

External links
http://en.e-obce.sk/obec/svrbice/svrbice.html
Official homepage

Villages and municipalities in Topoľčany District